is a fictional character and the protagonist of Final Fantasy VIII, a role-playing video game that was produced by Square (now Square Enix). Within the game's plot, Squall is an 17-year-old student at Balamb Garden, a prestigious military academy for elite mercenaries (known as "SeeDs"). Forced into becoming the  due to his outstanding skills, Squall befriends his underlings, and falls in love with Rinoa Heartilly. These relationships, combined with the game's plot, gradually change him from being a loner to an open, caring person. Squall has appeared in several other games, including Chocobo Racing, Itadaki Street Special, and the Kingdom Hearts series as the older mentor-like figure named .

Squall was designed by Tetsuya Nomura with input from game director Yoshinori Kitase. He was modeled after the actor River Phoenix. Squall's weapon, the gunblade, was made so it would be difficult to master. To ensure players understand Squall's silent attitude, Kazushige Nojima made the character's thoughts open to them. Squall's first voiced appearance is in the first Kingdom Hearts game, in which he is voiced by Hideo Ishikawa in Japanese and by David Boreanaz in English; Doug Erholtz has since assumed the role for later English-speaking appearances.

Squall had a mixed reaction from critics, some of whom judging him poorly in comparison with other Final Fantasy heroes due to his coldness and angst, and others praised his character development. The character has been popular, and his relationship with Rinoa has been praised.

Creation
While previous games in the Final Fantasy franchise involved an ensemble cast, for Final Fantasy VIII the Square staff decided to create a story centered around a hero and the heroine according to director Yoshinori Kitase. The rest of the characters were created to support the relationship between the duo. When asked about what is one thing Kitase would change about the game, he mentioned the FH concert where Rinoa Heartily mocks Squall by mimicking his mannerisms and he raises his hand at her and she dodges. Writer Kasushige Nojima was against this action, claiming a man should not hit a girl. Square's Hiroki Chiba said the scene in which Squall and Rinoa embrace in space is his favorite in the Final Fantasy franchise due to the use of Faye Wong's song "Eyes On Me" in the background and because he had to adjust every frame to make the scene work. 

The first illustration of Squall was used to create the world around him. The game's logo that depicted Squall embracing Rinoa was left open for interpretation by players.  After Nojima created the scenario, Nomura created the game's introduction movie mostly on his own which left a major positive reaction on the Square staff. In Final Fantasy VIII Nojima wanted to give players insight into Squall's thoughts in contrast to VII, which encouraged players to speculate on them. According to Nojima, the development staff made Squall "cool". In the video game it is implied the character Laguna Loire is Squall's father but Square Enix has never confirmed this idea. Nomura designed Squall to contrast with Laguna; while Laguna is seen as a friendly man, Squall is distant and silent. The staff found this problematic and thus Squall was given a character arc of him opening up to others to make the story easier to make fitting for a lone wolf. While at first these two characters' stories run parallel, they would ultimately clashed as conceptualized by Nomura.

In the original Japanese game, Squall has a tendency to respond negatively to other characters' comments by using sarcastic remarks like "well, excuse me". In the English localization this was turned into a catchphrase known as "whatever".

Design

Squall Leonhart was the first character Nomura designed for Final Fantasy VIII; he was inspired by actor River Phoenix, although Nomura said "nobody understood it". The scar on Squall's forehead was also left ambiguous although Nomura said it was important for him. After objections from Kitase, Nomura made the character more masculine and added a scar across Squall's brow and the bridge of his nose to make him more recognizable similar to Cloud Strife's striking spiky hair from Final Fantasy VII, leaving its cause up to scenario writer Kazushige Nojima.

Nomura's design of Squall included a fur lining along his jacket collar as a challenge for the game's full motion video designers. Nomura created Squall's  and its silver accessories. The weapon is a sword that has components of a revolver that send vibrations through the blade when they are triggered; this inflicts additional damage as Squall strikes an enemy if the player presses the R1 trigger on the controller. Although the weapon was intended as a novel way for players to control weapons in battle, Nomura said he feels it looks odd in retrospect and that it was very difficult to master. According to other staff members, Nomura's idea with the Gunblade was combine the two weapons and expand the sense of strength.

Portrayal

While Final Fantasy VIII does not use voice acting, Squall has a voice in the Square Enix series Kingdom Hearts, in which he is known as Leon. He is voiced by David Boreanaz in the English version of the game and Hideo Ishikawa in the Japanese version. He returns in Kingdom Hearts II and is voiced in the English version by Doug Erholtz, who said he had a "fun journey" voicing Leon and that it was a "really fun role to play". 

For the Kingdom Hearts series, Nomura decided to use Squall as a mentor character to newcomer Sora. Event planner Jun Akiyama persuaded Nomura to change Squall's name to Leon in order to make his introduction more surprising to the players as he is first mentioned in a letter from Mickey Mouse. The last name Leonhart was removed for unspecified reasons. Meanwhile, some parts of his design were changed to reference Rinoa's, most noticeably the wings in his jacket in order to signify that something happened between the two in the past. However, the real reason for the two being split was because Nomura had problems writing Rinoa out of all Final Fantasy VIII characters. Leon's design was revised to be more effeminated using the original sketches from Final Fantasy VIII that only appeared in the game's logo. Although polygons were used alongside other returning Final Fantasy characters, Leon could not return in Kingdom Hearts III which bothered many of the staff members.

In the Final Fantasy fighting game, Erholtz said that Squall came across as an easy character to understand but felt he was not very emotive. This stoic personality led to Erholtz claim that Squall is fighting an inner darkness as shown by his facial expressions. Erholtz found the game to be fun to do due to all the people he worked with.

Appearances

Final Fantasy VIII
At the beginning of Final Fantasy VIII, Squall is known as a "lone wolf" because he never shows his feelings and seems unresponsive to his associates. His superiors including his teacher Quistis Trepe consider him challenging to deal with but respect his talents. Squall is stoical and his taciturn nature used for comic relief. He is forced into a heroic role midway through the game when Cid, headmaster of Balamb Garden, appoints him the leader of the academy. During a late battle against Galbadia Garden, Squall has difficulty leading because of his lingering isolation. Although other characters try to become less reserved and Rinoa Heartilly expends considerable energy pursuing him, it takes time for him to accept the others' friendship, and fall in love with Rinoa. Later in the game, Squall becomes more comfortable in a leadership role, especially when he must fight Ultimecia.

Throughout the game, Squall has a rivalry with Seifer Almasy. The two characters scar each other at the beginning but later they are supposed to cooperate; they still quarrel, however. Although Seifer later allies with the Sorceress, requiring Squall to fight him several times, Squall still feels a camaraderie with Seifer.

According to flashbacks during the game, Squall grew up in an orphanage with the other playable characters, except Rinoa. The orphans were cared for by Edea; although Squall remembers little about his past, he becomes an emotionally detached, cynical, and introverted boy whose goal is to go through life without emotional ties or dependence. He gradually warms and his detachment from his companions is later revealed to be a defensive mechanism to protect himself from the emotional pain he suffered when he and his older sister were separated.

After Ultimecia is defeated, the time and space she had absorbed begin to return to normal, pulling Squall's comrades back into their places in the timeline while Squall returns to the orphanage and meets a younger Edea. Squall plants the ideas for Garden and SeeD in her mind, creating an origin paradox; Squall must become the leader of Balamb Garden so he can pass its version of SeeD tradition to Edea, who teaches them to her husband Cid, who co-founds Balamb Garden, which admits Edea's orphans—including Squall.

Other appearances
Squall appears as a non-playable character in Kingdom Hearts, in which he wears a short leather jacket with red wings on the back and a Griever necklace. Squall takes the name Leon as an alias because he is ashamed of not protecting those he loved from the Heartless when his home world the Radiant Garden was consumed by darkness. His role in Kingdom Hearts is to help guide the protagonist Sora in his battle against the Heartless. Although Squall's appearance and age differ—he is 25 in Kingdom Hearts— and 17 in Final Fantasy VIII), his personality remains the same. A memory-based version of Squall (as Leon) appears in Kingdom Hearts: Chain of Memories teaching gameplay in a tutorial. In the sequel Kingdom Hearts II game, he works with his friends to restore their world alongside Sora while facing the army of Heartless creatures used by the villains, Organization XIII. Squall also appears as an opponent in Olympus Coliseum tournaments, where he is often paired with other Final Fantasy characters. His virtual replica appears in Kingdom Hearts coded, in which it meets Sora's virtual replica. Leon's latest appearance is in the Remind DLC of Kingdom Hearts III as a cameo. He is also featured in the Kingdom Hearts manga where his portrayal is more comical.

Squall is a secret character in Chocobo Racing and Itadaki Street Special, and a sprite version of him occasionally appears on the loading screen of the PlayStation version of Final Fantasy VI. He appears as a playable character in every Dissidia: Final Fantasy title. He is one of Cosmos' chosen warriors to determined to fight Chaos' Ultimecia. He returns with his Kingdom Hearts as downloadable content (DLC) in Dissidia 012 where Squall is defeated by Kain Highwind from Final Fantasy IV who wants him to stop from fighting Chaos' mannekins army. In the latest installment, Dissidia NT, Squall teams up with several other Materia soldiers, mostly Bartz from Final Fantasy V, and faces Jecht from Final Fantasy X.

He is a playable character in Itadaki Street Portable and is the main character representing Final Fantasy VIII in the rhythm games Theatrhythm Final Fantasy, its follow-up Curtain Call, and the arcade-only game TFF: All Star Carnival. Squall also appears as a premium character in Pictlogica Final Fantasy and Final Fantasy: All The Bravest, both of which are designed for Android and iOS. He is also present in Mobius Final Fantasy where Squall finds himself in an alternate version of Balamb Garden.

Reception

Popularity
GamesRadar called Squall the fifth-best Final Fantasy hero of all time, praising the development of his personality and his improved interactions with other characters. GameZone rated him the fourth-best character in the franchise, saying while fans "either love or hate this guy" he becomes, despite little dialogue, the "ultimate anti-hero" of an entertaining journey. GameDaily ranked him sixth on its list of the "Top 25 Gaming Hunks", stating while critics described the character as a jerk, his character design, especially his scar, make him visually appealing. Den of Geek listed Squall as one of the most sexually appealing video game characters based on the design, especially his scar. In a 2008 Oricon poll, Squall was voted the tenth-most-popular video-game character. He was voted the 29th-best video-game character by Famitsu readers in February 2010. Complex listed him as the one of the greatest Final Fantasy characters. In a NHK poll from 2020, Squall was voted as the 13th best Final Fantasy character.

Critical response

Critical reaction to Squall was mixed. Jack Patrick Rodgers of PopMatters said Squall's cynicism and frustration with those around him made him a strong character but "coldly inhuman". Despite sharing a similar view, GameSpot said the "standoffish because of some repressed Wagnerian broodiness, in which case he was kind of interesting". According to IGN, the problem with the game was that is too centered around Squall's who comes across as a "jerk" most of the time, making him impossible to relate. 1UP.com still found him irrating, comparing him with similar archetypes explored in the franchise, but Edge compared Squall unfavorably with Final Fantasy VII protagonist Cloud Strife, as the former's angst is not given a proper source unlike the latter's The Gamer said Squall's antisocial personality might divide gamers. Eurogamer commented that while Squall remains as unlikable character even after his character arcs that contrast the more social and expressive Final Fantasy leads like Tidus or Noctis Lucis Caelum, he still remained as a realistic take on a soldier. While noting that Squall manages to become a better person, the changes are minimum and the idea of him being able to save the world comes across as "cringe comedy" due to its characterization which makes him do several mistakes.

There was also commentary about Squall and Rinoa's relationship. GamesRadar Brett Elston criticized it, comparing it with the romance from Attack of the Clones. However, he stated in a different article, "Squall and Rinoa are at the heart of it all" even if they do not properly develop. According to Ryan Woo of Complex, the problem with the romance was it because it was mostly one-sided from Rinoa's side until the latter parts of the game where Squall's development makes it come across as forced. Mike Gorby, writing for Goomba Stomp, said the character lacks realism in comparison to Rinoa. On a more positive view, the website called Squall and Rinoa the best couple created by Square Enix, noting the differences between them and that their relationship is the first in the series to drive the plot of a game. The couple was on The Inquirers list of most-memorable video-game love teams; comments again focused on the differences between them. Christopher Michael Baker of Allgame said that his romance changes the main character for the better as he originallly hated him.

There was commentary over Squall's Leon persona. RPGInformer was shocked by his introduction not only due to the crossover element provided in the first game but also because Squall was voiced for the first time. Despite being initially confused with Leon's appearance and weaponry in the first Kingdom Hearts boss fight, Polygon enjoyed his character. In a retrospect, the writer found the idea of the crossover ridiculous. Arnold Katayev of PSXextreme praised Squall's redesign in Kingdom Hearts as the game's best character design. Comic Book Resources lamented how Squall and the rest of the Final Fantasy characters became cameos in Kingdom Hearts III and the player never gets the chance to fight against them. VentureBeat said that while Kingdom Hearts offered Squall a more passable backstory, he still lacked development to the point he is often overshadowed by Laguna not only in his original appearance but also Dissdia. Also, talking about Disidia, RPGamer called Squall said although he tries to distance himself from others, "he can't help but draw people to him, be it sorceresses or gun-slinging ladies' men". 

Kotaku commented that voice actor David Boreanaz made "stilted and odd" and, among other Kingdom Hearts actors, he was overshadowed by Billy Zane's portrayal of Xehanort, also referred as Ansem. However, GamesRadar praised Boreanaz. GameRant believes David Boreanaz was chosen for Squall's role due to voicing a similar brooding anti-hero, Angel, in Buffy the Vampire Slayer with Doug Erholtz providing a nearly identical performance in following games. Hideo Ishikawa's performance as Squall was highlighted as popular within even if he never got the chance to properly voice him in his original game as said by fans in Animate Times.

See also
 Characters of Final Fantasy VIII

References

External links

 

Characters designed by Tetsuya Nomura
Fictional bodyguards in video games
Fictional child soldiers
Fictional knights in video games
Fictional mercenaries in video games
Fictional private military members
Fictional swordfighters in video games
Final Fantasy characters
Final Fantasy VIII
Male characters in video games
Orphan characters in video games
Science fantasy video game characters
Square Enix protagonists
Video game characters introduced in 1999